The following television stations broadcast on digital or analog channel 8 in Canada:

 CBNT-DT in St. John's, Newfoundland and Labrador
 CFCN-TV-8 in Medicine Hat, Alberta
 CFCN-TV-12 in Moyie, British Columbia
 CFCN-TV-18 in Coleman, Alberta
 CFJC-TV-3 in Merritt, British Columbia
 CFJC-TV-5 in Williams Lake, British Columbia
 CFQC-DT in Saskatoon, Saskatchewan
 CFRN-TV-6 in Red Deer, Alberta
 CFWL-TV-1 in Invermere, British Columbia
 CFYK-DT in Yellowknife, Northwest Territories
 CHBC-TV-3 in Oliver, British Columbia
 CHEM-DT in Trois-Rivières, Quebec
 CICT-TV-1 in Drumheller, Alberta
 CIHF-DT in Halifax, Nova Scotia
 CITM-TV-2 in Quesnel, British Columbia
 CIVA-DT-1 in Rouyn-Noranda, Quebec
 CIVV-DT in Saguenay, Quebec
 CJDC-TV-2 in Bullhead Mountain, British Columbia
 CJOH-TV-8 in Cornwall, Ontario
 CKCK-DT in Regina, Saskatchewan
 CKCW-DT-1 in Charlottetown, Prince Edward Island
 CKNX-TV in Wingham, Ontario
 CKTN-TV in Trail, British Columbia
 CKYA-TV in Fisher Branch, Manitoba

08 TV stations in Canada